Walter Russell Shaw,  (December 20, 1887 – May 29, 1981) was a politician from Prince Edward Island.

A native of West River, Shaw was educated at Prince of Wales College, the Nova Scotia Agricultural College and the University of Toronto. On his return to Prince Edward Island, he farmed for several years, becoming a noted livestock breeder. Shaw worked as a civil servant in the provincial department of agriculture from 1934 to 1954, rising to the position of deputy minister. He also helped found the PEI Federation of Agriculture serving as its first general secretary. He entered politics in 1957 when he was chosen leader of the Progressive Conservative Party. He led the party to victory in the 1959 election becoming the 22nd premier at the age of 71.

The Shaw government supported the expansion of the province's food processing industry, instituted a regional system of high schools and revamped the employment system and pay scale for the civil service. Despite its support for the farming industry, Shaw's government failed to reverse the decline in the number of family farms and was unable to successfully diversify the economy. His government was defeated by the Liberal Party in 1966.

Shaw stepped down as party leader in 1968, and was succeeded by George Key, although as Key was not a sitting member of the legislature Shaw continued to serve as leader of the opposition until 1970, when he retired at the age of 82.

In 1971, he was made an Officer of the Order of Canada. Shaw was inducted into the Canadian Agricultural Hall of Fame in 1980.

References 
 

1887 births
1981 deaths
People from Queens County, Prince Edward Island
Premiers of Prince Edward Island
Officers of the Order of Canada
Progressive Conservative Party of Prince Edward Island MLAs
Progressive Conservative Party of Prince Edward Island leaders
Prince of Wales College alumni
Nova Scotia Agricultural College alumni
University of Toronto alumni